The 1989 Arizona State Sun Devils football team was an American football team that represented Arizona State University in the Pacific-10 Conference (Pac-10) during the 1989 NCAA Division I-A football season. In their second season under head coach Larry Marmie, the Sun Devils compiled a 6–4–1 record (3–3–1 against Pac-10 opponents), finished in fifth place in the Pac-10, and were outscored by their opponents by a combined total of 258 to 241.

The team's statistical leaders included Paul Justin with 2,591 passing yards, David Winsley with 470 rushing yards, and Ron Fair with 1,082 receiving yards.

Schedule

Personnel

References

Arizona State
Arizona State Sun Devils football seasons
Arizona State Sun Devils football